James Johnson (unknown – December 7, 1825) was a U.S. Representative from Virginia.

Biography
Born in Virginia, Johnson completed preparatory studies.  He graduated from the College of William and Mary, in Williamsburg, Virginia, about 1795.  He studied law, and was admitted to the bar and practiced in Williamsburg.  He served as delegate to the State constitutional convention, 1788.  He served as member of the Virginia House of Delegates from 1797 to 1804, 1806, 1807, and 1809–1813. In 1807, he moved to Isle of Wight County, Virginia and continued the practice of law.

Johnson was elected as a Democratic-Republican to the Thirteenth and to the three succeeding Congresses and served until his resignation on February 1, 1820 (March 4, 1813 – February 1, 1820).  He was appointed collector of customs at Norfolk, February 1, 1820 and served until his death on December 7, 1825, in Norfolk, Virginia.

Sources

1825 deaths
Delegates to the Virginia Ratifying Convention
18th-century American politicians
Virginia lawyers
Members of the Virginia House of Delegates
College of William & Mary alumni
People from Isle of Wight County, Virginia
Year of birth unknown
Democratic-Republican Party members of the United States House of Representatives from Virginia